Chaïm Soutine (13 January 1893 – 9 August 1943) was a French painter of Belarusian-Jewish origin who made a major contribution to the expressionist movement while living and working in Paris.

Inspired by classic painting in the European tradition, exemplified by the works of Rembrandt, Chardin and Courbet, Soutine developed an individual style more concerned with shape, color, and texture than representation, which served as a bridge between more traditional approaches and the developing form of Abstract Expressionism.

Early life

Soutine was born Chaim-Iche Solomonovich Sutin, in Smilavičy (Yiddish: סמילאָוויץ, romanized: Smilovitz) in the Minsk Governorate of the Russian Empire (present-day Belarus). He was Jewish and the tenth of eleven children born to parents Zalman (also reported as Solomon and Salomon) Moiseevich Sutin (1858–1932) and Sarah Sutina (née Khlamovna) (died in 1938). From 1910 to 1913 he studied in Vilnius at a small art academy. In 1913, with his friends Pinchus Kremegne and Michel Kikoine, he emigrated to Paris, where he studied at the École des Beaux-Arts under Fernand Cormon. He soon developed a highly personal vision and painting technique.

Career
For a time, he and his friends lived at La Ruche, a residence for struggling artists in Montparnasse where he became friends with Amedeo Modigliani. Modigliani painted Soutine's portrait several times, most famously in 1917, on a door of an apartment belonging to Léopold Zborowski, who was their art dealer. Zborowski supported Soutine through World War I, taking the struggling artist with him to Nice to escape the possible German invasion of Paris.

After the war Paul Guillaume, a highly influential art dealer, began to champion Soutine's work.  In 1923, in a showing arranged by Guillaume, the prominent American collector Albert C. Barnes, bought 60 of Soutine's paintings on the spot.  Soutine, who had been virtually penniless in his years in Paris, immediately took the money, ran into the street, hailed a Paris taxi, and ordered the driver to take him to Nice, on the French Riviera, more than 400 miles away.

Carcass paintings
Soutine once horrified his neighbours by keeping an animal carcass in his studio so that he could paint it (Carcass of Beef). The stench drove them to send for the police, whom Soutine promptly lectured on the relative importance of art over hygiene. There's a story that Marc Chagall saw the blood from the carcass leak out onto the corridor outside Soutine's room, and rushed out screaming, "Someone has killed Soutine." Soutine painted 10 works in this series, which have since become his most well-known. His carcass paintings were inspired by Rembrandt's still life of the same subject, Slaughtered Ox,  which he discovered while studying the Old Masters in the Louvre.
Soutine produced the majority of his works from 1920 to 1929. From 1930 to 1935, the interior designer Madeleine Castaing and her husband welcomed him to their summer home, the mansion of Lèves, becoming his patrons, so that Soutine could hold his first exhibition in Chicago in 1935. He seldom showed his works, but he did take part in the important exhibition The Origins and Development of International Independent Art held at the Galerie nationale du Jeu de Paume in 1937 in Paris, where he was at last hailed as a great painter.

German invasion
Soon afterwards France was invaded by German troops. As a Jew, Soutine had to escape from the French capital and hide to avoid arrest by the Gestapo. He moved from one place to another and was sometimes forced to seek shelter in forests, sleeping outdoors.

Illness and death
Suffering from a stomach ulcer and bleeding badly, Soutine left a safe hiding place for Paris for emergency surgery, which failed to save his life.  On 9 August 1943, he died of a perforated ulcer. He was interred in Cimetière du Montparnasse, Paris.

Legacy

In February 2006, an oil painting of his controversial and iconic series Le Bœuf Écorché (1924) sold for a record £7.8 million ($13.8 million) to an anonymous buyer at a Christie's auction held in London—after it was estimated to fetch £4.8 million. In February 2007, a 1921 portrait of an unidentified man with a red scarf (L'Homme au Foulard Rouge) sold for $17.2 million—a new record—at Sotheby's London auction house. 

One of the beef paintings, known as Le bœuf, circa 1923, was sold for $1 million in 2004 and resold six months later for twice that price to the National Gallery of Art in Washington, D.C.. Heirs of the first seller sued to have the painting returned, claiming the price was unfairly low, and a complex settlement in 2009 required the painting to be transferred to them. In May 2015, Le Bœuf achieved a record price for the artist of $28,165,000 at the Christie's curated auction Looking forward to the past. 

Roald Dahl placed him as a character in his 1952 short story "Skin".

The Jewish Museum in New York has presented major exhibitions of Soutine's work in An Expressionist in Paris: The Paintings of Chaim Soutine (1998) and Chaim Soutine: Flesh (2018).

In 2020, Soutine's painting Eva became a symbol of pro-democracy protests in Belarus.

Gallery

Portraits and figures

Still Lifes

Landscapes

Footnotes

References
 
 
 Tuchman, Maurice; Chaim Soutine (1893–1943) , Los Angeles County Museum of Art, 1968
 Tuchman, Maurice; Esti Dunow (1993) Chaim Soutine (1893–1943): catalogue raisonné. Köln: Benedikt Taschen Verlag.
 Chaïm Soutine and his Contemporaries: from Russia to Paris, Ben Uri Gallery and Museum, 2012, 
 Soutine: The power and the fury of an eccentric genius by Stanley Meisler 
 Ifkovic, Ed. Soutine in Exile: A Novel. Createspace, 2017.
 Chaïm Soutine, documentary film by Valérie Firla, written by Valérie Firla and Murielle Levy, 52 min, Les Productions du Golem, Ed. Réunion des musées nationaux, broadcast in France in 2008 .

External links

 An artwork by Chaïm Soutine at the Ben Uri site
 Hecht Museum
 Amedeo Modigliani, "Chaim Soutine" (1917)
 New record price for Soutine Painting
 Chaim Soutine: Flesh
 Chaim Soutine Museum - Smilovichy
 The Yiddish Life of Chaim Soutine (1893-1943): New Materials

1893 births
1943 deaths
People from Chervyen District
People from Igumensky Uyezd
Belarusian Jews
Jews from the Russian Empire
Emigrants from the Russian Empire to France
French people of Belarusian-Jewish descent
Belarusian painters
Russian painters
French Expressionist painters
20th-century French painters
20th-century French male artists
French male painters
Jewish painters
Modern painters
School of Paris
Jewish School of Paris
Deaths from ulcers
Burials at Montparnasse Cemetery